Żabnik  is a settlement, part of the village of Krobusz, in the administrative district of Gmina Biała, within Prudnik County, Opole Voivodeship, in southern Poland.

The name of the village is of Polish origin and comes from the word żaba, which means "frog".

References

Villages in Prudnik County